Parker is an unincorporated community in Scott County, in the U.S. state of Missouri.

History
A post office called "Parkers Station" was established in 1875, and remained in operation until 1883. The community has the name of the Parker family, proprietor of a local sawmill.

References

Unincorporated communities in Scott County, Missouri
Unincorporated communities in Missouri